Toronto Defiant is a Canadian professional Overwatch esports team based in Toronto, Ontario. The Defiant compete in the Overwatch League (OWL) and are a member of the league's West region. Founded in 2018, Toronto began play as one of eight expansion teams in 2019 and is one of two professional Overwatch teams based in Canada (the other, Vancouver Titans). The team is owned by OverActive Media, who also owned the Montreal Rebellion, a former academy team for the Defiant that competed in Overwatch Contenders (OWC).

At the end of each of their first three years, the Defiant overhauled their roster, keeping no more than three players from the previous year.

History

OWL Expansion 
On September 7, 2018, Blizzard Entertainment announced that OverActive Media (OAM) had purchased a slot for a Toronto-based franchise. On the same day, Splyce announced that they would be working with OAM to form and operate the unnamed Toronto team, with OAM's Chris Overholt and Splyce's Marty Strenczewilk as the team owners. Former CEO of the Canadian Olympic Committee Chris Overholt was named the president and CEO of the franchise. "Who could have predicted what [esport] is and what this has become globally," Overholt said in an interview. "This thing is not set to explode, it's exploding and I think we're well positioned to take this on in Toronto and Canada."

Lee "Bishop" Beom-joon was appointed as the team's first head coach. On October 24, 2018, OAM and Splyce officially revealed the branding, name, and staff of the team. Bishop would be joined by General Manager Jaesun "Jae" Won, assistant coach Yun "Bubbly" Ho Cho, strategic coach Kim "Don" Dongwook, and analyst Dennis "Barroi" Matz. The team signed an all-Korean roster, composed of OWL players and experienced Overwatch Contenders Korea players.

Early years: 2019–present 

Toronto Defiant's first regular season OWL match was a 3–2 victory against the Houston Outlaws on February 15, 2019, in their inaugural season. After posting a 5–2 record in Stage 1, the Defiant qualified for the Stage 1 playoffs, but a 0–3 loss against the Shock eliminated the team in the quarterfinals. Throughout the remainder of the season, Toronto gradually added more Western players to their roster, such as the damage players Andreas "Logix" Berghmans and Liam "Mangachu" Campbell. The team failed to recreate the success they found in Stage 1, winning only three matches in their final four months of play. A 2–3 loss to the Fusion on August 4 officially eliminated Toronto from postseason contention, and three days later, the team released head coach Bishop, leaving assistant coaches Optidox, Mobydik, and Barroi to lead the team in the final weeks of the regular season.

Over the following off-season, the Defiant parted ways with the vast majority of their roster, aside from support player Park "RoKy" Joo-seong, Logix, and Mangachu. The team rebuilt around a core of Canadian Overwatch players, such as damage players Lane "Surefour" Roberts and Brady "Agilities" Girardi. Additionally, the team signed former Paris Eternal coach Felix "Féfé" Münch as team's new head coach. After a 3–5 start to the 2020 season, head coach Féfé retired, with assistant coach David "Lilbow" Moschetto taking his place as interim head coach for the remainder of the season. The Defiant struggled to find much success for the remainder of the season, with the exception of a run during the North America Summer Showdown tournament, in which Defiant made the semifinals. Toronto finished the season in 15th place overall with a 8–14 record, including bonus wins. The team advanced to the North America play-in tournament, where they lost to the Los Angeles Gladiators by a score of 2–3.

In the offseason preceding the 2021 season, the Defiant again overhauled their roster, releasing all of their players, aside from Logix. The team signed former Philadelphia Fusion head coach Kim "KDG" Dong-gun as their new head coach, who signed a mix of veterans and rookies to the team. In late May 2021, the Defiant had a COVID-19 outbreak in its facility, sidelining both of their damage players, Logix and Jeong "Heesu" Hee-su. The team signed rookie Luka "Aspire" Rolovic on a 30-day contract as a replacement, but after his performance on the team, Toronto signed him to a full contract. The Defiant had a 6–6 record entering the final tournament cycle of the season, the Countdown Cup. In the final week of the regular season, the Defiant defeated the Paris Eternal to secure a spot in the West play-in tournament. However, the team lost to the San Francisco Shock in the play-in finals on September 5.

Prior to the start of the 2022 season, Toronto dropped all of their players, aside from Heesu. The team signed several veterans, including former Shock support player Lee "Twilight" Ju-seok, former Los Angeles Gladiators tank player Kim "MuZe" Young-hun, and former Fusion tank player Choi "HOTBA" Hong-joon. After a win 3–0 win over the Boston Uprising, the Defiant qualified for the 2022 season playoffs and became one of five teams in the league that had qualified for every tournament in the season. Toronto finished the regular season with a 12–12 record and the seventh seed in the season playoffs. The Defiant lost to the Houston Outlaws, 0–3, in the first round of the playoffs, dropping them to the lower bracket. They lost their following match to the Hangzhou Spark, 2–3, ending their season.

Team identity 
On October 24, 2018, the franchise name was revealed as the Toronto Defiant; the name "Defiant" was chosen to "represent the strength, character, and resiliency of Toronto." Branding work was done in partnership with the Overwatch League and OverActive's agency of record Diamond Marketing. The logo and official colors were also released. The logo for Toronto Defiant displays the letter T inscribed in the letter D in the team's colours of red, black, white, and grey.

Personnel

Current roster

Head coaches

Awards and records

Seasons overview

Individual accomplishments 
All-Star Game selections
Neko (Park Se-Hyun) – 2019
Agilities (Brady Girardi) – 2020
Kariv (Youngseo Bak) – 2020
Nevix (Andreas Karlsson) – 2020

Academy team

On February 14, 2019, Overactive Media partnered with Mirage Sport Électronique to launch Toronto Defiant's official academy team in Montreal to compete in Overwatch Contenders. "We are really excited about partnering with Yannick and his team to launch the first pro esports franchise in Quebec," Overholt said in an interview. "Today is about continuing our commitment to growing esports nationwide, and expanding our Toronto Defiant fanbase in Quebec and across Eastern Canada." On February 19, the franchise announced that the team would be known as the Montreal Rebellion.

References

External links 

 

 
Overwatch League teams
Esports teams established in 2018
Esports teams based in Canada